The Birmingham Botanical Gardens is  of botanical gardens located  adjacent to Lane Park at the southern foot of Red Mountain in Birmingham, Alabama. The gardens are home to over 12,000 different types of plants, 25 unique gardens, more than 30 works of original outdoor sculpture, and several miles of walking paths.  With more than 350,000 annual visitors, the Birmingham Botanical Gardens qualify as one of Alabama's top free-admittance tourist attractions.

The gardens include a garden center that has a library (the largest public horticulture library in the U.S.), auditorium, Linn-Henley Lecture Hall, Blount Education Center, Gerlach Plant Information Center, Alabama Cooperative Extension System office, Arrington Children's Plant Adventure Zone, and a restaurant.

History
The Birmingham Botanical Gardens began as an idea prior to 1960.  The Birmingham mayor of that time,  James W. Morgan, led an effort to establish the gardens on a  portion of unused city property east of the Birmingham Zoo on the side of Red Mountain. The garden officially opened in 1963. The Birmingham Botanical Society, now known as the Friends of Birmingham Botanical Gardens, was established in 1964 with a mission of helping the city to support and improve the garden.

Gardens and garden features

See also
 List of botanical gardens and arboretums in Alabama

References

External links

 Birmingham Botanical Gardens Official Website

Botanical gardens in Alabama
Parks in Birmingham, Alabama
Tourist attractions in Birmingham, Alabama
Japanese gardens in the United States